Sunuchi may refer to:
 Sichi
 Sonuchi